Booker may refer to:

Places
 Booker, Buckinghamshire, a hamlet in England
 Booker, Texas, a town in the United States
 RAF Booker, a Royal Air Force airfield from 1941 to 1963

People
 Booker (name), a list of people with the surname or given name

Arts and entertainment
 Booker (TV series), a spin-off of 21 Jump Street
 , a fictional character in Case Closed
 Booker Prize, presented annually for the best original full-length novel
 Booker, a character in the comic strip U.S. Acres
 Booker DeWitt, protagonist of the video game BioShock Infinite
 Booker Baxter-Carter, son of Raven Baxter in the television series Raven's Home

Brands and enterprises
 Booker Group, the United Kingdom 's largest food wholesale operator
 Booker Software, a software company headquartered in New York City
 Booker's, a bourbon produced by the Jim Beam distillery

Roles
 Booker, one who plans the order of and events within pro wrestling matches.
 Booking agent, or talent agent, a person who helps to arrange appearances by entertainers

Other uses
 United States v. Booker, a 2005 Supreme Court ruling permitting federal judges to depart from the United States Federal Sentencing Guidelines
 Booker (horse) Australian racehorse